United States v. Phellis, 257 U.S. 156 (1921), was a decision by the United States Supreme Court, which held that shares in a subsidiary corporation issued to stockholders in the parent corporation were taxable as income.

See also
List of United States Supreme Court cases, volume 257

Further reading

External links

United States Supreme Court cases
United States Supreme Court cases of the Taft Court
United States taxation and revenue case law
1921 in United States case law